Acâș is a rural municipality of 2,827 inhabitants situated in Satu Mare County, Crișana, Romania. It is composed of four villages: Acâș, Ganaș (Gánás), Mihăieni (Krasznamihályfalva) and Unimăt (Újnémet).

Demographics

Ethnic groups (2002 census):

Hungarians: 55.7%
Romanians: 22.0%
Roma: 22.0%
Germans: 0.3%

According to mother tongue, 77.5% of the population speak Hungarian, while 22.3% speak Romanian as their first language.

Sister cities
 Markaz, Hungary

References

Communes in Satu Mare County
Localities in Crișana